Luding County, also known via its Tibetan name as Chagsam or Jagsam, is a county located in the southeast of the Garzê Tibetan Autonomous Prefecture in Sichuan province, China.

History

Geography 
Luding County is bordered by Tianquan County, Yingjing County, and Hanyuan County to the east, Shimian County to the south, and Kangding to the west and north.

The county is located within the Hengduan Mountains, within the southeastern edge of the Tibetan Plateau. The highest point in the county is Mount Gongga, along the southwestern border with Kangding. Mount Erlang is also located on the county's edge.

Climate

Administrative divisions
As of 2022, Luding County contains the following eight towns and one township:

Former administrative divisions

Demographics

Luding County has a total population of 86,234 as of 2022, up from approximately 80,000 at the end of 2004, and the 77,855 recorded in the 2000 Chinese Census.

Ethnic groups 
Luding County has a supermajority Han Chinese population, but is home to a number of ethnic minorities, who constitute about 22% of the county's population. The county's ethnic minorities include Tibetans, Yi, Qiang, Miao, Hui, Mongols, Tujia, Lisu, Manchus, Yao, Kam, Nakhi, Bouyei, Bai, Zhuang, and the Dai.

The following table shows the ethnic composition of Luding County:

Transport
China National Highway 318

References

External links
 Official Website (Chinese)
 Website (Chinese)

County-level divisions of Sichuan
Populated places in the Garzê Tibetan Autonomous Prefecture